Jacqueline Chretien is a New Hampshire politician.

Education
Chretien earned a PhD in molecular and cell biology from the University of California, Berkeley.

Career
On November 6, 2018, Chretien was elected to the New Hampshire House of Representatives where she represents the Hillsborough 42 district. She assumed office on December 5, 2018. She is a Democrat.

Personal life
Chretien resides in Manchester, New Hampshire. Chretien is married and has three children.

References

Living people
UC Berkeley College of Letters and Science alumni
Politicians from Manchester, New Hampshire
Women state legislators in New Hampshire
Democratic Party members of the New Hampshire House of Representatives
21st-century American politicians
21st-century American women politicians
Year of birth missing (living people)